W. Steven Pray is an American pharmacist and academic who is an expert on non-prescription (over-the-counter) medicines. He is the Bernhardt Professor of Nonprescription Products and Devices at Southwestern Oklahoma State University's College of Pharmacy. Pray also volunteers as pharmacy director for the Weatherford Agape Medical Clinic, a free clinic.

He won the National Association of Boards of Pharmacy's Henry Cade Memorial Award for 2008.

He has published several books, including A history of nonprescription product regulation and Nonprescription product therapeutics.

Pray has been quoted by the Boston Globe and Newhouse News Service about over-the-counter medicines and their alternatives.

He is married to Carole Pray.

References

External links
Faculty page at Southwestern Oklahoma State University

American pharmacists
Southwestern Oklahoma State University faculty
Living people
Year of birth missing (living people)